Attibele is Town Municipality Council (TMC) in Anekal taluk, Bengaluru Urban district Karnataka, India. The Karnataka check post border is situated here, which is marked by an arch. It is 32 km from Bengaluru on NH 7.

References

Cities and towns in Bangalore Urban district